SMS Nürnberg ("His Majesty's Ship Nürnberg"), named after the Bavarian city of Nuremberg, was a  light cruiser built for the German Imperial Navy (Kaiserliche Marine). She was built by the Imperial Dockyard in Kiel, laid down in early 1906 and launched in August of that year. She was completed in April 1908. Nürnberg was armed with ten  guns, eight  SK L/55 guns, and two submerged torpedo tubes.

Nürnberg served with the fleet briefly, before being deployed overseas in 1910. She was assigned to the East Asia Squadron. At the outbreak of World War I in August 1914, she was returning to the German naval base at Tsingtao from Mexican waters. She rejoined the rest of the Squadron, commanded by Vice Admiral Maximilian von Spee, which steamed across the Pacific Ocean and encountered a British squadron commanded by Rear Admiral Christopher Cradock. In the ensuing Battle of Coronel on 1 November, the British squadron was defeated; Nürnberg finished off the British cruiser . A month later, the Germans attempted to raid the British base in the Falkland Islands; a powerful British squadron that included a pair of battlecruisers was in port, commanded by Vice Admiral Doveton Sturdee. Sturdee's ships chased down and destroyed four of the five German cruisers;  sank Nürnberg, with heavy loss of life.

Design

The Königsberg -class ships were designed to serve both as fleet scouts in home waters and in Germany's colonial empire. The Königsberg class was an iterative development of the preceding . All four members of the class were intended to be identical, but after the initial vessel was begun, the design staff incorporated lessons from the Russo-Japanese War. These included internal rearrangements and a lengthening of the hull.

She displaced  at full load. Her propulsion system consisted of two 3-cylinder triple expansion engines powered by eleven coal-fired Marine-type water-tube boilers. Nürnberg had a crew of 14 officers and 308 enlisted men.

The ship was armed with a main battery of ten  SK L/40 guns in single pedestal mounts. Two were placed side by side forward on the forecastle, six were located amidships, three on either side, and two were side by side aft. They were supplied with 1,500 rounds of ammunition, for 150 shells per gun. The ship was also equipped with eight  SK guns with 4,000 rounds of ammunition. She was also equipped with a pair of  torpedo tubes with five torpedoes submerged in the hull on the broadside.

Service history
Nürnberg was ordered under the contract name "Ersatz " and was laid down at the Imperial Dockyard in Kiel on 16 January 1906. At her launching on 28 August 1906, the mayor of her namesake, Dr. Georg von Schuh, christened Nürnberg, after which fitting-out work commenced. She was commissioned into the High Seas Fleet on 10 April 1908.

After serving briefly with the fleet in German waters, Nürnberg was sent overseas in 1910. She was assigned to the Kaiserliche Marine's East Asia Station at Tsingtao as part of Admiral Count Maximilian von Spee's East Asia Squadron. During the Mexican revolution she was positioned off the west coast of Mexico.

World War I

In the summer of 1914, Nürnberg was steaming across the Pacific to relieve Leipzig on the Mexico station. With the outbreak of World War I, Spee planned a return of his squadron to Germany, sailing through the Pacific, rounding Cape Horn, and then forcing his way north through the Atlantic. Spee decided the best place to concentrate his forces was Pagan Island in the northern Marianas Islands, a German possession in the central Pacific. All available colliers, supply ships, and passenger liners were ordered to meet the East Asia Squadron there. On 11 August, Spee arrived in Pagan; he was joined by several supply ships, as well as Emden and the auxiliary cruiser Prinz Eitel Friedrich.

The four cruisers then departed the central Pacific, bound for Chile. On 13 August the captain of the Emden, Commodore Karl von Müller, persuaded Spee to detach his ship for commerce raiding. The ships again coaled after their arrival at Enewetak Atoll in the Marshall Islands on 20 August. On 6 September Spee detached Nürnberg, along with the tender Titania, to cut the British cable system at Fanning Island. The cruiser flew a French ensign to deceive the defenders, and succeeded in destroying the station on 7 September. Nürnberg then rejoined the fleet at Christmas Island. later that day. In order to keep the German high command informed of his activities, Spee sent Nürnberg on 8 September to Honolulu to send word through neutral countries. Spee chose the ship because the British were aware she had left Mexican waters, and so her presence in Hawaii would not betray the movements of the entire East Asia Squadron. She was also ordered to contact German agents to instruct them to prepare coal stocks in South America for the squadron's use. Nürnberg brought back news of the Allied conquest of the German colony at Samoa.

On 14 September, Spee decided to use his two armored cruisers to raid the British base at Apia; he sent Nürnberg to escort the squadron's colliers to the rendezvous location. At the Battle of Papeete on 22 September, Nürnberg and the rest of the East Asia Squadron bombarded the colony. During the bombardment, the French gunboat Zélée was sunk by gunfire from the German ships. Fear of mines in the harbor prevented von Spee from seizing the coal that lay in the harbor. By 12 October, the squadron had reached Easter Island. There they were joined by Dresden and Leipzig, which had sailed from American waters. After a week in the area, the ships departed for Chile.

Battle of Coronel

This flotilla was reinforced by the elderly pre-dreadnought battleship  and the armored cruiser , the latter, however, did not arrive until after the Battle of Coronel. Canopus was left behind by Cradock, who likely felt that her slow speed would prevent him from bringing the German ships to battle. On the evening of 26 October, the East Asia Squadron steamed out of Mas a Fuera, Chile, and headed eastward. Spee learned that Glasgow had been spotted in Coronel on the 31st, and so turned towards the port.

He arrived on the afternoon of 1 November, and to his surprise, encountered Good Hope, Monmouth, and Otranto as well as Glasgow. Canopus was still some  behind, with the British colliers. At 17:00, Glasgow spotted the Germans; Cradock formed a line with Good Hope in the lead, followed by Monmouth, Glasgow, and Otranto in the rear. Spee decided to hold off on engaging the British until the sun had set more, at which point the British ships would be silhouetted by the sun. Nürnberg was some distance behind the rest of the German squadron, and joined the ensuing action later; she had been delayed from searches of neutral steamers.

On 3 November, Nürnberg, Scharnhorst, and Gneisenau steamed into Valparaiso, Chile to resupply their coal and other supplies. They were limited to 24 hours per international law, which also allowed only three warships in any neutral port at a time; the other two cruisers, Leipzig and Dresden, had to return to Mas a Fuera. After regrouping at Mas a Fuera, Spee had decided to raid British shipping routes in the South Atlantic. On 21 November, the East Asia Squadron put into St. Quentin Bay to coal; the crews piled up coal on the ships' decks to allow them to steam all the way to the Port of Santa Elena, where Spee had arranged for colliers out of Montevideo to meet them on 5 December.

Battle of the Falkland Islands

In the aftermath of the Battle of Coronel, Spee decided to attack the British base at Port Stanley in the Falkland Islands. Nürnberg and Gneisenau were to raid the harbor, destroy the wireless station, and burn the coal stocks, while the rest of the squadron screened for British warships. Spee was under the incorrect impression that the Falkland Islands were undefended.

When Nürnberg and Gneisenau approached the islands early on 8 December, the old battleship Canopus opened fire and drove them off. The Germans were surprised to see the warships in the harbor, and Spee decided to retreat. Sturdee ordered his ships to raise steam and pursue the Germans. His battlecruisers caught up and opened fire at 12:50; Spee decided that he could hold off the battlecruisers with Scharnhorst and Gneisenau to allow the three light cruisers time to escape. In response, Sturdee sent his light cruisers to chase down Nürnberg, Dresden, and Leipzig.

Nürnberg turned to port in order to bring her entire broadside into action, which was mimicked by Kent. By that time, Kents shells were raining down on Nürnberg and were causing major damage. A serious fire broke out forward at 18:02, and by 18:35, she was dead in the water and had ceased firing. Kent temporarily ceased fire, but after noticing Nürnberg was still flying her battle ensigns, resumed combat. After five more minutes of shelling, Nürnberg struck her colors, and Kents crew prepared to lower lifeboats to pick up survivors.

Only twelve men were picked up before the ship capsized and sank at 19:26, and five of them died after being rescued. Among the dead was one of Spee's sons, Otto von Spee. In total, 327 officers and men were killed in the battle. In the course of the engagement, Nürnberg had hit Kent thirty-eight times, but did not cause significant damage. One shell struck one of Kents casemate guns and ignited the propellant charges inside, but the magazine was flooded before the fire could destroy the ship. The sinking was commemorated in a painting entitled The Last Man by Hans Bohrdt, which depicted a German sailor waving the Imperial ensign as Nürnberg slipped beneath the waves.

Notes

Footnotes

Citations

References

Further reading
 

Königsberg-class cruisers (1905)
Ships built in Kiel
1906 ships
World War I cruisers of Germany
World War I shipwrecks in the Atlantic Ocean
Shipwrecks of the Falkland Islands
Maritime incidents in December 1914